The 2007 Ladies European Tour was a series of weekly golf tournaments for elite female golfers from around the world which took place from January through December 2007. The tournaments were sanctioned by the Ladies European Tour (LET). The tour featured 24 official money events with prize money totalling more than €10.5 million, as well as the Women's World Cup of Golf and the biannual Solheim Cup. Sophie Gustafson won the Order of Merit with earnings of €222,081.47, while Bettina Hauert was voted Player's Player of the Year. Louise Stahle won Rookie of the Year honours, finishing 23rd in the Order of Merit.

Tournament results
The table below shows the 2007 schedule. The numbers in brackets after the winners' names show the number of career wins they had on the Ladies European Tour up to and including that event. This is only shown for members of the tour.

Major championships are shown in bold.

Order of Merit rankings

See also
2007 LPGA Tour
2007 in golf

References 

Ladies European Tour
Ladies European Tour
Ladies European Tour